Tambor Airport  is an airport serving Tambor, Costa Rica. The airport also serves tourist destinations like Mal Pais, Santa Teresa, Montezuma, and the Cabo Blanco Absolute Natural Reserve.

Tambor airport is the sixth-busiest airport in Costa Rica, and the fourth busiest domestic-only after Puerto Jiménez, Quepos and Tamarindo airports. The airport is owned and managed by Costa Rica'a Directorate General of Civil Aviation (DGAC).

Airlines and destinations

Passenger statistics
These data show number of passengers movements into the airport, according to DGAC's Statistical Yearbooks.

See also

Transport in Costa Rica
List of airports in Costa Rica

References

External links

OurAirports - Tambor Airport
Tambor Domestic Airport

Airports in Costa Rica
Buildings and structures in Puntarenas Province